There are at least 9 named lakes and reservoirs in Hot Spring County, Arkansas.

Lakes
According to the United States Geological Survey, there are no named lakes in Hot Spring County.

Reservoirs
	Clearwater Lake, el.  
	Crouchwood Lake, el.  
	DeGray Lake, el.  
	Jones Lake, el.  
	Kinzey Lake, el.  
	Lake Bobbie, el.  
	Lake Catherine, el.  
	Lower Lake, el.  
	Lucinda Lake, el.

See also

 List of lakes in Arkansas

Notes

Bodies of water of Hot Spring County, Arkansas
Hot Spring